Frank Alvin Yocum (December 11, 1892 – June 29, 1970) was an American football player and coach. Yocum attended Oberlin High School graduating in 1910 and Oberlin College graduation 1915. He played professional football as a halfback for the 1916 Cleveland Indians.

Yocum coached the Western Reserve football team for two seasons, from 1917 to 1918, while attending the Western Reserve Dental School. 

In 1990, 20 years after his death, Yocum was inducted into the Case Western Reserve Spartans sports Hall of Fame.

Head coaching record

References

External links
 Case Western Reserve profile
 

1892 births
1970 deaths
Case Western Spartans athletic directors
Case Western Spartans baseball coaches
Case Western Spartans cross country coaches
Case Western Spartans football coaches
Case Western Spartans track and field coaches
Oberlin Yeomen football players 
Case Western Reserve University School of Medicine alumni
People from Shaker Heights, Ohio
Coaches of American football from Ohio
Players of American football from Ohio
Baseball coaches from Ohio